Ricardo Mercader Parás Jr. (February 17, 1891 – October 10, 1984) was the Chief Justice of the Supreme Court of the Philippines from April 2, 1951 until February 17, 1961.

Career
He earned his Bachelor of Laws degree from the University of the Philippines in 1913, and placed second (after future president Manuel Roxas) in the bar examinations that same year. He engaged in private law practice before being elected in the House of Representatives in 1919. His judicial career started when he was appointed judge in 1924, and later on appointed in 1936 to the Court of Appeals. He became an associate justice in 1941, and was a member of the wartime judiciary during the Japanese Occupation. He was appointed Chief Justice of the Supreme Court ten years later.

Accomplishments

Paras made a frugal approach in order to survive and maintain the efficiency of service during the post-war years. He advocated the elimination of the case backlog, and encouraged speedy adjudication and deliberation of the cases. His dedication to such advocacy paid off, when there was no more backlog upon his retirement in 1961.

Trivia

His son, Edgardo L. Paras, became an associate justice of the Supreme Court from 1986 to 1992.

According to Justice J.B.L. Reyes, during the deliberations of the People v. Hernandez rebellion case, Justice Sabino Padilla (who is the brother of the solicitor general arguing for the government) openly accused Chief Justice Paras of being prejudiced against the government and asking biased questions during the oral argument. Riled, Parás rebutted, and a heated exchange soon ensued, which would have worsened had not they restrained themselves.

References
 Cruz, Isagani A. (2000). Res Gestae: A Brief History of the Supreme Court. Rex Book Store, Manila

Chief justices of the Supreme Court of the Philippines
Associate Justices of the Supreme Court of the Philippines
Members of the House of Representatives of the Philippines from Quezon
1891 births
1984 deaths
People from Marinduque
20th-century Filipino judges
University of the Philippines alumni
University of the Philippines College of Law alumni
Justices of the Court of Appeals of the Philippines
Governors of Quezon
Members of the Philippine Legislature